The following is a list of all team-to-team transactions that have occurred in the National Hockey League during the 1967–68 NHL season. It lists what team each player has been traded to, signed by, or claimed by, and for which player(s) or draft pick(s), if applicable.

Trades between teams

May

June

August

September

October

November

December

January

February

March

References

 hockeydb.com - search for player and select "show trades"
 
 

Transactions
National Hockey League transactions